Mie Skov (born 24 May 1986 in Frederikssund, Denmark) is a retired table tennis player from Denmark who participated in the 2012 Summer Olympics.  She defeated Egyptian player Nadeen El-Dawlatly in four sets. In the second round, she lost 3–4 to Natalia Partyka, a Polish player.

References

Danish female table tennis players
1986 births
Living people
Table tennis players at the 2012 Summer Olympics
Olympic table tennis players of Denmark
People from Frederikssund Municipality
Sportspeople from the Capital Region of Denmark